The Cuscatlán Formation is a geologic formation in El Salvador. It preserves fossils dating back to the Pliocene to Middle Pleistocene (Blancan to Irvingtonian) period.

Fossil content 
 Borophagus hilli
 Meizonyx salvadorensis
 Megalonyx obtusidens
 cf. Arctotherium sp.
 Cuvieronius sp.
 Eremotherium sp.
 Geochelone sp.
 Mixotoxodon sp.
 Cervidae indet.

See also 

 List of fossiliferous stratigraphic units in El Salvador

References

Bibliography

Further reading 
 
 S. D. Webb and S. C. Perrigo. 1984.  Late Cenozoic Vertebrates from Honduras and El Salvador. Journal of Vertebrate Paleontology 4(2):237-254

Geology of El Salvador
Neogene North America
Blancan
Irvingtonian
Fossiliferous stratigraphic units of North America
Paleontology in El Salvador
Formations